So This Is Arizona is a 1931 American pre-Code Western film directed by J. P. McGowan and starring Hal Taliaferro, Fred Church and Buzz Barton.

Cast
 Hal Taliaferro as Bob Ransome 
 Don Wilson as Wobbly 
 Fred Church as Jake McKeever 
 Lorraine LaVal as Josie Gerrard 
 Tete Brady as Hattie McKeever 
 Buzz Barton as Buzz 
 Gus Anderson as Sheriff 
 Joe Lawliss as Henchman

Plot
Ranger Bob Ransome encounters conflict when he must arrest a man (Jake McKeever) who is the brother of Ransome's fiancée, Hattie. The arrest causes a breakup with Hattie, but Ransome is helped by a ranch heiress (Josie Gerrard) who loves him.

References

Bibliography
 Michael R. Pitts. Poverty Row Studios, 1929–1940: An Illustrated History of 55 Independent Film Companies, with a Filmography for Each. McFarland & Company, 2005.

External links
 

1931 films
1931 Western (genre) films
American Western (genre) films
Films directed by J. P. McGowan
1930s English-language films
1930s American films